The Governor General's Award for English-language drama honours excellence in Canadian English-language playwriting. The award was created in 1981 when the Governor General's Award for English-language poetry or drama was divided.

Because the award is presented for plays published in print, a play's eligibility for the award can sometimes be several years later than its eligibility for awards, such as the Dora Mavor Moore Award for Outstanding New Play or the Floyd S. Chalmers Canadian Play Award, which are based on the theatrical staging. Titles which compile several works by the playwright into a single volume may also be nominated for or win the award.

Winners and nominees

1980s

1990s

2000s

2010s

2020s

Multiple winners and nominees

2 Wins 
 Catherine Banks
 John Mighton
 Colleen Murphy
 Morris Panych
 Sharon Pollock
 Jordan Tannahill
 Judith Thompson
 George F. Walker

6 Nominations 
 Judith Thompson (2 wins)

5 Nominations 
 Daniel MacIvor (1 win)
 Jason Sherman (1 win)

4 Nominations 
 Robert Chafe (1 win)
 Wendy Lill
 Michael Healey (1 win)
 John Mighton (2 wins)
 George F. Walker (2 wins)

3 Nominations 
 Joan MacLeod (1 win)
 Hannah Moscovitch (1 win)
 Colleen Murphy (2 wins)
 Morris Panych (2 wins)
 Sharon Pollock (2 wins)
 Donna-Michelle St. Bernard
 Jordan Tannahill (2 wins)

2 Nominations 
 Catherine Banks (2 wins)
 Daniel Brooks (both with cowriters)
 Marjorie Chan
 Anna Chatterton (consecutive, 1 with cowriters)
 Marie Clements
 Charlotte Corbeil-Coleman
 Don Druick
 Brad Fraser
 Linda Griffiths
 Tomson Highway (consecutive)
 Karen Hines
 Maureen Hunter
 Anosh Irani
 Lawrence Jeffrey
 John Krizanc (1 win)
 Kevin Loring (1 win)
 Bryden MacDonald
 Michael MacLennon (consecutive)
 Richard Sanger
 Erin Shields (1 win)
 Vern Thiessen (1 win)
 Guillermo Verdecchia (consecutive, 1 win)
 David Yee (1 win)
 David Young

Drew Hayden Taylor and Anosh Irani have also both been nominated for the Governor General's Award for English-language fiction. James Reaney won the award three times before Poetry and Drama were split in 1981 into separate categories.

References

English
Awards established in 1981
1981 establishments in Canada
Drama
Canadian dramatist and playwright awards

English-language literary awards